Burris Creek is a  long 2nd order tributary to the Fisher River in Surry County, North Carolina.

Variant names
According to the Geographic Names Information System, it has also been known historically as:
Burriss Creek

Course
Burris Creek rises on the Pine Branch divide about 4 miles south of Blevins Store, North Carolina.  Burris Creek then flows southeast and then turns northeast to join the Fisher River about 4 miles southeast of Blevins Store.

Watershed
Burris Creek drains  of area, receives about 49.0 in/year of precipitation, has a wetness index of 366.74, and is about 56% forested.

See also
List of rivers of North Carolina

References

Rivers of North Carolina
Rivers of Surry County, North Carolina